The Oakland Historic District is a historic district within the city of Oakland, Oregon, United States.  It was listed on the National Register of Historic Places in 1979.

One contributing property is the Stearns Hardware Store building that was built in 1891.

References

See also

National Register of Historic Places in Douglas County, Oregon
Geography of Douglas County, Oregon
Historic districts on the National Register of Historic Places in Oregon
1979 establishments in Oregon